"Baby Come to Me" is a 1989 R&B/Soul single by American singer–songwriter Regina Belle. Released on October 2, 1989 on Columbia Records, The song was written by Narada Michael Walden and Jeffrey Cohen and produced by Narada Michael Walden. This song is from Belle's sophomore album Stay with Me.

Background
The single was Regina Belle's first number one on the Hot Soul Singles chart, as well as the singer third entry onto the Hot 100, where "Baby Come to Me" peaked at number 60. This song was certified gold by the RIAA on January 8, 1990. Belle performed the song at the 1990 Soul Train Music Awards, where it was also nominated for Best R&B/Urban Contemporary Single, Female.

Charts

Weekly charts

Year-end charts

References

1989 singles
1989 songs
Songs written by Narada Michael Walden
Song recordings produced by Narada Michael Walden
Song recordings produced by Walter Afanasieff
Columbia Records singles
Regina Belle songs
Contemporary R&B ballads
Soul ballads
1980s ballads
Songs written by Jeff Cohen (songwriter)